Tomoharu is a masculine Japanese given name.

Possible writings
Tomoharu can be written using different combinations of kanji characters. Some examples:

友治, "friend, manage/cure"
友春, "friend, spring"
友温, "friend, warm up"
友晴, "friend, clear (weather)"
知治, "know, manage/cure"
知春, "know, spring"
知温, "know, warm up"
知晴, "know, clear (weather)"
智治, "intellect, manage/cure"
智春, "intellect, spring"
智温, "intellect, warm up"
智晴, "intellect, clear (weather)"
共治, "together, manage/cure"
共晴, "together, clear (weather)"
朋英, "companion, manage/cure"
朋晴, "companion, clear (weather)"
朝治, "morning/dynasty, manage/cure"
朝春, "morning/dynasty, spring"
朝温, "morning/dynasty, warm up"
朝晴, "morning/dynasty, clear (weather)"

The name can also be written in hiragana ともはる or katakana トモハル.

Notable people with the name
, Japanese anime director
, Japanese Magic: The Gathering player
, real name Tomoharu Kato (加藤 大晴), Japanese sumo wrestler
, Japanese agricultural leader and politician
, Japanese actor and singer known by his stage name Ryūsei Nakao

Fictional characters
, from Asura Cryin'

Japanese masculine given names